Sergey Vitalievich Gaikov (born May 9, 1965 in Moscow) is a Soviet-born, Russian sprint canoer who competed from the late 1980s to the mid-1990s. He won two bronze medals at the ICF Canoe Sprint World Championships, earning them in 1991 (K-4 500 m for the Soviet Union) and 1993 (K-4 10000 m for Russia).

Galkov also competed in the K-2 1000 m event for the Soviets at the 1988 Summer Olympics in Seoul, but was eliminated in the semifinals.

References

Sports-reference.com profile

1965 births
Canoeists at the 1988 Summer Olympics
Living people
Olympic canoeists of the Soviet Union
Russian male canoeists
Soviet male canoeists
ICF Canoe Sprint World Championships medalists in kayak